Saratok is a district, in Betong Division, Sarawak, Malaysia.

Towns and villages

Saratok
The town of Saratok is the seat of the district and houses the Saratok District Office.

Lichok
St James Chapel was one of the oldest Anglian Chapels in Sarawak. The Church started several schools in the area before World War II.

References